Your Hundred Best Tunes was a BBC radio music programme, always broadcast on Sunday evenings, which presented popular works which were mostly classical excerpts, choral works, opera and ballads. The hundred tunes which made up the playlist were initially selected by the creator and presenter, Alan Keith. Subsequently, tunes were suggested by requests and polls of listeners.

History
The Hundred Best Tunes in the World was broadcast on the BBC Light Programme from 15 November 1959 until 7 February 1960, when Alan Keith's personal list of one hundred had all been played. The title was changed from 14 February 1960. At this point it ran for half an hour from 10 to 10.30 pm, but from 25 December 1960 it was extended and moved to earlier in the evening, running from 7.35 to 8.30 pm. From 12 March 1961 it adopted the 9 to 10 pm time slot which it would occupy for the rest of its life, on four different networks: it moved from the Light Programme to the Home Service from 5 January 1964, and remained there after it became Radio 4 from 1 October 1967, but returned to what had been the Light Programme, now renamed Radio 2, from 5 April 1970.

The last show was transmitted on 21 January 2007 – a run of over 47 years. For most of this time, it was presented by the original creator, Alan Keith, who continued up to the age of 94. After his death in 2003, Richard Baker presented the show. Holiday guest presenters included Evelyn Barbirolli, Rosalind Runcie, Earl Spencer and Ursula Vaughan Williams.

The show was cancelled by Lesley Douglas, Controller of Radio 2, who replaced it with a longer Melodies for You, presented by Alan Titchmarsh, which continued to play music from the same repertoire until it too was cancelled in 2011. A special edition of the format was aired on 30 December 2011, presented by Alfie Boe, who played a selection from the 2003 poll plus some of his own favourites.

The hundred best tunes
Polls were taken to confirm the choice of the hundred best tunes. The results of the last poll in 2003 are below. The previous poll was in 1997 and the position of each work in that earlier poll is shown in the right hand column.

Other media
Alan Keith published a book about the music played in the show in 1975. The Decca Record Company published a successful ten-volume series of records with the title The World of Your 100 Best Tunes. The BBC published a six-CD collection of the music selected by the final poll listed above.

See also
Classic FM Hall of Fame

References

External links
 Your One Hundred Best Tunes with Alfie Boe (2011 Special Edition)
 Your 100 Best Tunes – playlist on Spotify
 Your Hundred Best Tunes – presented by Alan Keith on 21 April 2002

BBC Home Service programmes
BBC Light Programme programmes
BBC Radio 2 programmes
BBC Radio 4 programmes
British classical music radio programmes
1959 radio programme debuts